Mary Hefferan (1873–1948) was an American bacteriologist. She was born in Eastmanville, Ottawa County, Michigan. She received her PhD in zoology from the University of Chicago in 1903.

After completion of her PhD, she remained at the University of Chicago as the curator of the bacteriology museum and as an instructor in the department of bacteriology.

References

1873 births
1948 deaths
People from Ottawa County, Michigan
University of Chicago alumni
American bacteriologists
Place of death missing
Date of birth missing
Date of death missing
Women bacteriologists
20th-century American biologists
American women biologists
University of Chicago faculty
American women curators
American curators
American women academics
20th-century American women scientists